Sherborne is a British full boarding Public School located in the town of Sherborne in north-west Dorset.

This list comprises predominantly 20th-century notable Old Shirburnians organised by profession.

Academia

 Alan Turing , mathematician, instrumental figure at Bletchley Park, father of Artificial Intelligence and the first modern computer.
 Alfred North Whitehead , mathematician and philosopher
 F. Sherwood Taylor chemist, Curator of the Museum of the History of Science, Oxford and Director of the Science Museum
 Francis John Lys, Provost of Worcester College, and Vice-Chancellor of the University of Oxford
 Harold Temperley, historian and former Master of Peterhouse, Cambridge
 John Newsom-Davis , FRCP FRS, FMedSci, neurologist
 Michael McCrum , former Headmaster of Eton College, former Master of Corpus Christi College, Cambridge and Vice-Chancellor of Cambridge University until 2004.
 Richard Atkinson , prehistorian and archeologist
 Sir Colin Lucas, former Master of Balliol College and Vice-Chancellor of Oxford University until 2001.
 Sir Derman Christopherson  FRS FREng, former Vice-Chancellor of Durham University and Master of Magdalene College, Cambridge
 Sir Malcolm Pasley Bt , literary scholar
 The Right Honourable The Lord Thomas of Swynnerton, historian

Entertainment and the arts

 Hugh Bonneville, actor, for example Downton Abbey
 Christopher Bowerbank, architect and raconteur
 Clive Carey, baritone singer and composer
 Charles Collingwood, actor
 Charlie Cox, actor
 Sir Richard Eyre CBE, film and theatre director, artistic director of the National Theatre 1988–97
 Phil Harvey, creative director and former manager of rock band Coldplay.
 Sir Michael Hopkins CBE, architect
 Jeremy Irons, actor, for example Brideshead Revisited and The Mission
 Rupert Maas English painting specialist & gallery owner
 Chris Martin, lead singer of rock band Coldplay
 Ian Messiter, creator of Just a Minute
 John Le Mesurier, actor, for example in Dad's Army
 Herbert Arnould Olivier, artist
 Lance Percival, actor
 Jon Pertwee, actor
 Jonathan Powell, Controller of BBC One (1987–1992)
 Albert Reginald Powys, architect and longtime Secretary of the Society for the Protection of Ancient Buildings
 James Purefoy, actor
 Roland Young, actor

Military

 Admiral Sir Horace Law  RN, Commander in Chief Naval Home Command 1971-2
 Admiral Sir James Perowne , Deputy Supreme Allied Commander Europe 1998–2002
 Brigadier Hugh Bellamy , commander of 6th Airlanding Brigade during the Rhine Crossing and  Operation Varsity, the famous airborne assault.
 Captain Keith Muspratt , World War One flying ace
 Field Marshal Sir Claud Jacob , WW1 Commander
 Flight Lieutenant Carl Raymond Davis  RAF, Battle of Britain flying ace
 General Sir Charles Monro Bt , Commander in Chief India 1916–1920, Governor of Gibraltar 1923–1928
 General Sir Jeremy Blacker , Master-General of the Ordnance 1991–1995
 General Sir John Wilsey , Commander in Chief Land Command 1995–1996
 General Sir Nicholas Parker , former Commander in Chief Land Command and former Deputy Commander of the International Security Assistance Force in Afghanistan
 Lieutenant Colonel Reginald Applin , developer of machine gun tactics and Conservative MP.
 Lieutenant Colonel Timothy Spicer , CEO of Aegis Defence Services
 Lieutenant General David Leakey , retired, former Gentleman Usher of the Black Rod 2010-18
 Lieutenant General Sir Martin Garrod  RM, former Commandant General Royal Marines 1987–90
 Lieutenant General Sir Steuart Pringle Bt,  RM, former Commandant General Royal Marines until 1984
 Major General Julian Thompson , Commander of Royal Marines (3 Commando Brigade) in the Falklands War
 Major General Patrick Cordingley , Commander Desert Rats (and overall British Commander) in the Gulf War
 Major General Sir Iain Mackay-Dick , former Major-General Commanding the Household Division and General Officer Commanding London District
 Major General Sir Roy Redgrave , former Commander of British Forces in Hong Kong
 Major General Rupert Jones , Deputy Commander Operation Inherent Resolve 2016-17

Intelligence
 Sir Christopher Curwen , British Intelligence Officer & former Head of the Secret Intelligence Service (MI6).
 Sir David Spedding , former Head of the Secret Intelligence Service (MI6)

Diplomacy and colonial administration

 Sir Alan Campbell , diplomat
 Sir Brian Barder KCMG, former UK High Commissioner to Australia
 Sir Donald MacGillivray , last British High Commissioner in Malaya
 Sir Hugh Norman-Walker , colonial administrator
 Sir John Weston , former UK Permanent Representative to the United Nations
 Sir Timothy Daunt , former UK Ambassador to Turkey and current Lieutenant Governor of the Isle of Man
 The Right Honourable Charles Bathurst, 1st Viscount Bledisloe  and former Governor-General of New Zealand.

Clergymen

 The Most Reverend Edwin Curtis, former Archbishop of the Indian Ocean
 The Reverend Rico Tice, priest and writer
 The Right Reverend and Right Honourable David Sheppard, Baron Sheppard of Liverpool, well-known former Bishop of Liverpool and England cricketer
 The Right Reverend Forbes Horan, former Bishop of Tewkesbury
 The Right Reverend Geoffrey Lunt, former Bishop of Ripon
 The Right Reverend Henry Henn, former Bishop of Burnley
 The Right Reverend Henry Whitehead DD, former Bishop of Madras
 The Right Reverend Neville Lovett CBE, DD, former Bishop of Salisbury
 The Right Reverend Paul Barber, former Bishop of Brixworth
 The Right Reverend Peter Mumford former Bishop of Truro 1981-9
 The Right Reverend Piers Holt Wilson, former Bishop of Moray, Ross and Caithness 1943–52
 The Venerable Arthur William Upcott DD, MA, eminent priest and educationalist, and Archdeacon of Hastings 1920–22.
 The Very Reverend Benjamin Lewers, former Provost of Derby Cathedral
 The Very Reverend Frank Bennett, former Dean of Chester and eminent Anglican scholar
 The Reverend Frederick Campbell Cardew

Broadcasting
 Tom Bradby, TV journalist and ITV News Political Editor
 Alistair Bunkall, TV journalist and Sky News Defence Correspondent
 Simon McCoy, TV journalist and BBC News news presenter
 Nick Thorpe, TV, radio and print journalist, and BBC News Central Europe Correspondent (1996–); formerly BBC Budapest Correspondent

Politics
 The Right Honourable William Cecil, 2nd Earl of Salisbury KG PC, 18th Century politician
 The Right Honourable Alan Lennox-Boyd, 1st Viscount Boyd of Merton CH PC DL, Secretary of State for the Colonies 1954-9
 Charles Beauclerk, Earl of Burford, peer
 The Right Honourable Sir Christopher Chataway, long-distance runner and Education Minister 1962–4.
 The Right Honourable Thomas Buchanan, Under-Secretary of State for India 1908-9
 Robert Key. Former Member of Parliament.
 Stanley Johnson, politician, writer, farmer and father of Boris Johnson
 Peter Oborne, journalist, author and political commentator
 Aidan Hartley, Kenya-born journalist, author and film-maker
Michael Marsham, 7th Earl of Romney (1910-2004), hereditary peer who served in the House of Lords.

Writers and poets

 Alec Waugh, author
 Anthony Lane, film critic
 Arthur Waugh, author, critic and publisher
 Cecil Day-Lewis CBE, poet
 David Cornwell, (a.k.a. John le Carré), writer, for example of Tinker, Tailor, Soldier, Spy
 John Cowper Powys, author, lecturer and philosopher
 Jon Stock, journalist and author
 Robert McCrum, writer and editor
 Tim Heald, journalist and author
 Warren Chetham-Strode MC, author and playwright

Sport
 James Adams, cricketer
 John Bain (1854–1929), England footballer and 1877 FA Cup Finalist
 Peter Donald, cricketer
 David Fursdon, cricketer and current Lord-Lieutenant of Devon
 Mervin Glennie, cricketer
 Ted Glover, cricketer
 Nick Greenstock, former England Rugby Union centre
 George Hargrave, cricketer
 Will Homer, rugby union 
Tom James, rugby union 
 Robin Kreyer, cricketer
 Sir Francis Lacey, cricketer and Secretary of the MCC
 Jeremy Quinlan, cricketer
 Justin Ricketts, cricketer
 Robert Rydon, cricketer
 Ollie Sale, cricketer
 Sir Hugh Vincent, rugby player (Wales)
 Algernon Whiting, cricketer

Other
 Sir Nathaniel Highmore GBE KCB, Government barrister and civil servant
 Sir Alastair Pilkington, director of the Bank of England
 Sir Thomas Villiers, businessman and politician prominent in Ceylon
 Sir Geoffrey Briggs, Chief Justice of Brunei and of Hong Kong, 1973-9
 Lieutenant Commander Peter Twiss  first person to exceed 1000 miles per hour
 Charles Palmer CIE, engineer and survivor of the siege of Lucknow
 King Mswati III, king of Swaziland.  Attended Sherborne International College
 His Highness Sheikh Tamim bin Hamad Al Thani, Emir of Qatar.  Attended Sherborne International College
 Ronald Cunningham, (a.k.a. The Great Omani), escapologist
 Nigel Dempster, journalist
 Franklin Adin Simmonds FRCS, orthopaedic surgeon
 John Insall, American, orthopaedic surgeon
 Frederick Slessor, railway engineer
 Tengku Hassanal Ibrahim, regent and crown prince of Pahang, Malaysia

Victoria Cross holders

Five Old Shirburnians have been awarded the Victoria Cross, to whom a memorial plaque was commissioned, the unveiling of which took place in the School Chapel on 19 September 2004.

Rear Admiral Henry James Raby VC CB.VC won in the Crimean War, when he was a lieutenant in the Naval Brigade. Raby was the first man to actually receive the medal, with Queen Victoria pinning it onto him in the first investiture.
Brigadier General Sir Arthur George Hammond VC, KCB DSOVC won in the Second Afghan War, when he was a captain in the Bengal Staff Corps, Indian Army
Major General Charles Edward Hudson VC, CB, DSO & Bar MCVC won in the First World War, when he was a temporary lieutenant colonel in the Sherwood Foresters
Major Edward Bamford VC, DSO, VC won in the First World War, when he was a captain in the Royal Marine Light Infantry
Captain John Hollington Grayburn VC, VC granted posthumously and he was gazetted captain; won in the Second World War, as a lieutenant in the Parachute Regiment

See also

 
 Notable Old Shirburnians born in the 8th to 17th centuries
 Notable Old Shirburnians born in the 18th century
 Notable Old Shirburnians born in the 19th century

References

External links 
Sherborne School
Old Shirburnian Society website

People educated at Sherborne School
Sherborne
Old Shirburnians